Bulgandry is a village community in the central part of the Riverina.  It is situated by road, about 6 kilometres south east of Rand and 12 kilometres north west of Walbundrie.

History 

The place name Bulgandry is derived from the local Aboriginal word meaning "boomerang in hand".

Walbundrie Reefs Post Office opened on 1 July 1875, was renamed Bulgandry in 1900 and closed in 1975.

The Walbundrie Football Association Australian rules football competition existed for one season only, 1914, consisting of the following clubs - Bulgandra, Burrumbuttock, Walbundrie and Walla. Bulgandra: 5.4 - 34 defeated Walla: 4.8 - 32 in the grand final.

Bulgandry shooting
At 11pm, on Saturday 8 February 1919, Bulgandra Hotel licensee Mrs. Mary Josephine Devlin, was shot in the right arm with a shot gun by a man at the hotel, shattering her arm. She was brought to Albury early on Sunday morning and her arm required amputation, but she died at 1pm. Mary was shot by Patrick Lawrence Gleeson, who had been living at the hotel and had developed a relationship with Mary. Patrick was tried and sentenced to 15 years in Goulburn Gaol.

Notes and references

Towns in the Riverina
Towns in New South Wales